Daniel Francis (born 10 July 2002) is a professional footballer who plays as a left-back. Born in England, he represents the Sierra Leone national team.

Professional career
A youth product of Bradford City, Francis transferred to the German club Rot Weiss Ahlen in 2020 and began his senior career in the Regionalliga.

International career
Francis was born in England to a Sierra Leonean Sherbro father and German mother. He made his debut with the Sierra Leone national team in a friendly 0–0 tie with Ethiopia on 26 August 2021.

References

External links
 
 
 

2002 births
Living people
Footballers from Bradford
Sierra Leonean footballers
Sierra Leone international footballers
English footballers
Sierra Leonean people of German descent
English sportspeople of Sierra Leonean descent
English people of German descent
Rot Weiss Ahlen players
Regionalliga players
Association football fullbacks
Bradford City A.F.C. players
2021 Africa Cup of Nations players